The Rotax 185 is a , single cylinder, two-stroke, direct drive, industrial engine, built by Rotax of Austria for use in fire fighting water pumps that has also been adapted as an aircraft engine for use in ultralight aircraft.

Development

The Rotax 185 was designed as a fire-fighting pump, but the rights to the design were sold by Rotax to the Wildfire Group who use the engine in their Mark 3 High Pressure Centrifugal Fire Pump.

Due to its design purpose as a water pump engine it proved reliable enough for use on ultralight aircraft, and was adopted as an engine for the twin-engine Ultraflight Lazair ultralight aircraft - as a replacement for the  Pioneer chainsaw engines used on the early Series I. The 185 provides enough power to allow the Lazair to be flown on floats.

In the Lazair application the 185 was used to drive two propellers stacked together in biplane configuration. This was not done for aerodynamic reasons but rather because the Lazair manufacturer had ample quantities of the nylon propellers on hand for its earlier engines and stacking them was more cost efficient than scrapping them and buying new propellers.

Applications

Lazair
 Wildfire Mark-3 High Pressure Centrifugal Fire Pump

Specifications (185)

References

External links

Air-cooled aircraft piston engines
Rotax engines
Two-stroke aircraft piston engines